Never Ever Do This at Home is a comedy-reality TV show that airs on Discovery Channel (Canada). Based on Ikke gjør dette hjemme, the show features hosts Teddy Wilson and Norm Sousa, who ignore the warning labels on a variety of household items, with varying results. The show made its debut on May 6, 2013 with two back-to-back episodes. The show has been bought by Spike TV to air in the United States. Reruns also air on MTV in Canada.

The hosts

Teddy Wilson 
Teddy Wilson is best known as the host of InnerSPACE, a science-fiction news show airing on Space.

He began his career in the entertainment industry as a child actor in You Can't Do That on Television. He went on to earn an Honours B.A. in political science and worked as a political advisor in the Ontario legislature. He left politics to work at MTV in 2005, and in 2008 was recruited by Space to host InnerSPACE. His first assignment was interviewing George Lucas.

Norm Sousa 
Norm Sousa is a comedian and actor from Toronto currently living in New York City.

He started his entertainment career at Humber College Comedy: Writing and Performance where, after graduation, he founded a comedy troupe called punchDRYSDALE which performed multiple times at the Toronto Sketch Comedy Festival. He later joined the comedy ensemble The Sketchersons, where he became the head writer and producer of Sunday Night Live.

Production 
On September 12, 2012, following the success of Ikke gjør dette hjemme in Norway, Discovery Channel Canada secured the rights to produce the first English-language version of the show from Norwegian broadcaster NRK through independent distributor DRG. Insight TV was commissioned to produce 13 30-minute episodes for the first season. Similar shows are planned for the Danish, German, and Swedish TV markets.

Filming began on an old farm house in southwestern Ontario where the hosts set up shop along with a crew of safety professionals, including firefighters. 20 cameras were installed in the farmhouse to capture every angle, including Phantom high-speed cameras that can capture 2,650 frames per second. The show focuses on the physics and chemistry behind the disasters caused by the hosts' experiments.

Season 2 was filmed in the Bradford, Ontario area.

Critical response 
Before the show's first episode aired, Bill Harris, of Canoe.ca, said the show appeals to "the defiant [...] kid [...] within all of us" and said the show works best when it focuses on potential disasters viewers might have wondered about, and said he didn't relate to experiments such as the walk-in microwave oven, since that's not what a normal person might think of.

Episodes

Season 1 (2013)
14 episodes aired in the first season, including a retrospective and behind-the-scenes special at the end of the season. Here are the highlights of the episodes.

Season 2 (2014)
Season 2 of Never Ever Do This At Home aired on May 12, 2014.

See also 
 Ikke gjør dette hjemme
 House Hazards - A similar Canadian show

References 

2010s Canadian reality television series
2013 Canadian television series debuts
Television series by Insight Productions
Discovery Channel (Canada) original programming
Spike (TV network) original programming
2014 Canadian television series endings
English-language television shows